"Canesadooharie" was a phonetic variant of a name of a river in the northern part of the U.S. state of Ohio.  Traditionally thought by historians to refer to the Black River of modern-day Lorain County, it is now believed more likely to have been the Huron River, which passes Milan before meeting Lake Erie at the village of Huron.  See also Guahadahuri, and Huron River, Ohio.

History of name
In 1755, 18-year-old James Smith was captured from Pennsylvania by indigenous Americans, and brought to live with their nation in Northern Ohio. (The custom of this tribe was to "adopt" a Caucasian male to replace one of their warriors killed in battle against them.) Smith lived here as one of them until 1759, having eventually found an opportunity to safely return to his Pennsylvania home. He later wrote about his own experiences. Much of his time in Northern Ohio was spent near a river which he calls "Canesadooharie". Smith, who was very well-educated for that time period, recorded that this river was "about 8 miles east of Sandusky" and "interlocks with the West Branch of the Muskingum". This corresponds to the Huron River, which is about 10 miles east of Sandusky Bay's mouth, and which nearly meets the headwaters of the Black Fork of the Mohican River, which connects into the Muskingum. But one additional detail that Smith recorded about the "Canesadooharie", that it had a "falls", "12 to 15 feet high, and nearly perpendicular". This detail was seized upon by later historians, as evidence that the river of Smith's travels, was instead the Black River of Lorain County, which has two separate and impressive falls in the vicinity of Elyria, Ohio. More historians added to the confusion, by attributing the meaning of the word "canesadooharie" as "black pearl", or even more romantically as "string of black pearls"; but it is not known what evidence, if any, that those historians used to support that translation. Later historians simply repeated the earlier theories, until finally Smith's "Canesadooharie" was accepted to be the Black River, instead of the Huron River. It is unfortunate that the original historians disregarded Smith's many details about his own travels here. The Black River is about 30 miles, not "about 8 miles", from Sandusky Bay; and the two separate falls on the Black River are each about 40 feet in height, and absolutely perpendicular, poorly matching Smith's description beyond the word "falls". The likelihood is that the single falls which Smith experienced over a many week period in 1756, "12 to 15 feet high, and nearly perpendicular", i.e. high and very steep rapids, was somewhere in the vicinity of (now) Norwalk, Ohio; and by the mid-1800s, nature had probably reduced them to being more like actual rapids, than a "falls". Regardless, due to 19th-century historians' errors,  "Canesadooharie" is now accepted as an alternate name for the Black River, rather than for the Huron River for which it was intended.

References

Rivers of Ohio
Rivers of Lorain County, Ohio
Tributaries of Lake Erie